Janet Southgate (born 24 September 1955) is an English former cricketer who played as a right-handed batter. She appeared in 13 Test matches and 17 One Day Internationals for England between 1976 and 1985. She played domestic cricket for Sussex.

References

External links
 

1955 births
Living people
People from Eastcote
England women Test cricketers
England women One Day International cricketers
Sussex women cricketers